The 1919 William & Mary Indians football team represented the College of William & Mary as a member of the South Atlantic Intercollegiate Athletic Association (SAIAA) during the 1919 college football season. Led by first-year head coach James G. Driver, William & Mary finished the season with an overall record of 2–6–1 and a mark of 1–3 in SAIAA play.

Schedule

References

William and Mary
William & Mary Tribe football seasons
William and Mary Indians football team